Tring is one of the languages of Borneo, in Sarawak, Malaysia. Ethnologue classifies the language as threatened.

References

Further reading 
 Sidney H. Ray. 1913. The Languages of Borneo. Sarawak Museum Journal 1(4). 1-196.
 Robert Blust. 2010. The Greater North Borneo Hypothesis. Oceanic Linguistics 49(1). 44-118.

External links 
 Kaipuleohone's Robert Blust collection includes written materials for Tring

Apo Duat languages
Languages of Malaysia
Endangered Austronesian languages